Kutlupur is a village in Gaya district of Indian state of Bihar. It is located near the borders of Gaya and Jehanabad district. This is situated at around 40 km from the Gaya and around 50 km from the historical Bodh Gaya.

The village's biggest accomplishment is in its use of non-conventional energy. For example, all the villagers rely on solar panels as state government couldn't ensure electricity lines to village till 2010. In 2013, the village was flooded.

References

Villages in Gaya district